The 1906 Ohio State Buckeyes football team was an American football team that represented Ohio State University during the 1906 college football season. The Buckeyes compiled an 8–1 record and outscored their opponents by a combined total of 153 to 14 in their first season under head coach Albert E. Herrnstein.

Schedule

References

Ohio State
Ohio State Buckeyes football seasons
Ohio State Buckeyes football